Cadair Berwyn or Cader Berwyn is a mountain summit in north-east Wales with a height of  above sea level. It is the highest point in the Berwyn range, the highest in North East Wales and the highest significant summit in Wales outside the National Parks. Cadair Berwyn and Foel Cedig to the west are the two Marilyns that form the Berwyn range. The undulating plateau of the range also includes a large number of other summits above , including satellite summits of Cadair Berwyn and many which are classed as Nuttalls.

The mountain lies on main ridge of the Berwyns which runs north–south. The eastern side of the ridge is characterised by steep drops and crags including Craig Berwyn north of the summit and Craig y Llyn to the south.  Craig y Llyn forms the headwall of a cwm, and it is to this that the word cadair (chair in Welsh) presumably refers.  Further north along the ridge is Cadair Bronwen, whilst to south the ridge continues to Moel Sych (meaning 'dry hill').

It is often reported that Moel Sych,  along the ridge, is of equal height, but Cadair Berwyn's spot height on the Ordnance Survey maps, where the trig point stands, is not the true summit. This summit is listed as Cadair Berwyn New Top on the Nuttall list. However, the name given to it by its discoverer, Bernard Wright, was Craig Uchaf.

In 1987 Bernard Wright, a rambler from Cheshire, was standing on Cadair Berwyn North Top (then said to be the highest mountain in Clwyd) when he noticed that a nearby peak appeared to be higher. After first denying it, the cartographers at the Ordnance Survey finally admitted that Bernard had discovered a 'new mountain' at 830 metres above sea level. Bernard's name for this peak was Craig Uchaf (highest rock) the topographical name fitting in well with those that the Welsh have been giving their landscape for centuries. Near the summit is a Bronze Age cairn. In 2014, accurate re-surveying using GPS by Myrddyn Phillips added an additional 2 metres to the height. Phillips uses the name Craig Berwyn rather than Cadair Berwyn for this summit.

Several other summits in the area are listed as Hewitts or Nuttalls, including Foel Wen (Welsh for white hill) and Mynydd Tarw (bull mountain).

Cadair Berwyn is the highest point (county top) of the historic county of Denbighshire. The historic border with Merionethshire also ran through the summit. Moel Sych and Cadair Berwyn North Top had been thought at one time to have been the joint county tops of Denbighshire, but resurveying demoted them as explained previously. Curiously, the historic county of Denbighshire lies on the eastern side on the main Berwyn ridge, but the modern council lies on the western side.

Cadair Berwyn stands between Snowdon and the Wrekin and blocks their line-of-sight. The view from the summit on a clear day is extensive and includes Snowdon, Cadair Idris, Brecon Beacons, Shropshire Hills, Peak District, Yorkshire Dales, Lake District and the Isle of Man. The peak is the nearest high mountain to a significant fraction of the population of the English Midlands but sees far fewer walkers than equivalent summits in the Lake District and Snowdonia.

There is a standing stone in the area, located near the summit between Cadair Berwyn and Tomle. This was re-erected in June 2008 by High Sports. The standing stone can be found at SJ080337.

Below the mountain is a small lake, Llyn Lluncaws.

On 11 August 1942, a United States Army Air Forces, Boeing B-17E Flying Fortress flying from RAF Polebrook to RAF Burtonwood crashed into the side of Cadair Berwyn resulting in the deaths of all eleven passengers and crew.

It is the location, as well as Cadair Bronwen, of an alleged UFO landing in 1974, known as the Berwyn Mountain UFO incident.

References

Further reading
 Gordon Emery - Curious Clwyd (1994)

External links
 Computer generated summit panoramas Cadair Berwyn index
 www.geograph.co.uk : photos of Cadair Berwyn and surrounding area

Marilyns of Wales
Hewitts of Wales
Mountains and hills of Denbighshire
Nuttalls
Highest points of Welsh counties
Aviation accidents and incidents locations in Wales